Kingswood House, formerly known as King's Coppice, is a Victorian mansion in South Dulwich, at the southerly tip of the London Borough of Southwark, United Kingdom. It is a Grade II listed building.

In 1811 William Vizard, the solicitor to Queen Caroline in her divorce from George IV, was granted a 63-year lease for Kingswood Lodge. When Vizard returned to his native Gloucestershire in 1831, others were granted the property leases.

From 1891 the house was owned by John Lawson Johnston (inventor of Bovril) who extended the house and remodelled the facade including adding battlements. Johnston acquired the nickname Mr Bovril and because of its castellated features Kingswood became known locally as Bovril Castle.

In the First World War Kingswood was used as a convalescence home for wounded Canadian soldiers. At this time it came to the notice of Lady Vestey who was doing social work in connection with the soldiers housed there. In 1919 her husband Sir William Vestey was granted an 80-year lease and in 1921 when he was raised to the peerage he became Baron Vestey of Kingswood in the County of Surrey. Kingswood was the Vesteys' main home until William's death.

In 1954 it was decided by the then Metropolitan Borough of Camberwell to turn the building into library and community centre, for the benefit of Kingswood Estate residents and in 1956 acquired the site by compulsory purchase. Lord Vestey's estate had by now been developed into a large residential area with the grounds occupied by houses, flats and shops. In 1965 it became the property of the London Borough of Southwark. It underwent substantial refurbishment in the 1980s and 1990s, and subsequently used for conferences, meetings, and civil marriages.

In the grounds in front of Kingswood House there are still some remains of the Pulham features. In 2011 a blue plaque was erected on the side of the building to commemorate John Lawson Johnston and his residence there.

The house is located just a few minutes walk from Sydenham Hill railway station.

Library 
Since 1956 the house held a public library. An opening ceremony, hosted by actor Peter Ustinov and the then Camberwell mayor Alderman John Evans, who used the opportunity of the library to read up on Ustinov, saying “I looked up Who’s Who’ and anyone who wants to know something about our distinguished visitor can find it in the library”.

It was remarked at the ceremony that the house was now 'as it should be', for the community and "not something reserved for one select and privileged family".

The 1960s saw the house store the then Camberwell borough's library service reserve stock collection.

In 1993 the library was threatened with closure, with the suggestion that the library could move into a space at the Seeley Drive shops. The community ran a Save The Library campaign, gathering 720 signatures in a petition. 

Between 2014 and 2019 the library's funding was cut to nearly half, from £23,885 to £12,618. The library closed in 2020 at the beginning of the Covid-19 pandemic.

Present day 
In 2022, an organisation Kingswood Arts CIC (a subsidiary of Hartshorn Hook Enterprises) are set to take over the venue as an art centre. A click and collect service for library books is available nearby open two afternoons a week.

References

External links
 Kingswood House community website
 Kingswood Arts

Further reading
 Patrick Darby, Kingswood: A History of the House and its Estate (Dulwich Society, 1999) 

Grade II listed houses in London
Grade II listed buildings in the London Borough of Southwark
History of the London Borough of Southwark
Houses in the London Borough of Southwark
Country houses in London